Space Launch Complex 37 (SLC-37), previously Launch Complex 37 (LC-37), is a launch complex on Cape Canaveral Space Force Station, Florida.  Construction began in 1959 and the site was accepted by NASA to support the Saturn I program in 1963. The complex consists of two launch pads. LC-37A has never been used, but LC-37B launched uncrewed Saturn I flights (1964 to 1965) and was modified and launched Saturn IB flights (1966 to 1968), including the first (uncrewed) test of the Apollo Lunar Module in space (Apollo 5). It was deactivated in 1972.  In 2001 it was modified as the launch site for Delta IV, a launch system operated by United Launch Alliance.

The original layout of the launch complex featured one Mobile Service Structure which could be used to service or mate a rocket on either LC-37A or 37B, but not on both simultaneously.

Launch history

Rocket configuration

Saturn
All flights operated by NASA.

Delta
IN 1998, Boeing secured the right to use SLC-37 for launch of the Delta IV rocket family. Facility modifications were made to SLC-37B and te first launch occurred in 2002. The Delta IV Medium and Delta IV Heavy are launched from SLC-37.

Starship
NASA and SpaceX are discussing using LC-37 for future Starship launch pad, when Delta IV will be retired.

Photos

See also

List of spaceflights by year
List of Cape Canaveral and Merritt Island launch sites
Project Apollo
Cape Canaveral Launch Complex 34

References

External links

Boeing Delta IV website

Cape Canaveral Space Force Station
Launch complexes of the United States Space Force
Apollo program
1964 establishments in Florida